Mariela Castro's March: Cuba's LGBT Revolution is a 2016 documentary film by Jon Alpert for HBO about Mariela Castro's (Raul Castro's daughter and Fidel Castro's niece) LGBT advocacy work in Cuba.

See also
 LGBT rights in Cuba

References

2016 television films
2016 films
Documentary films about Cuba
Documentary films about LGBT topics
HBO documentary films
LGBT in Cuba
2016 LGBT-related films
2010s American films